Grande Fratello 8 is the eighth season of the Italian version of the reality show franchise Big Brother.  The show was produced by Endemol and aired from 21 January 2008 to 21 April 2008.

Housemates

Nominations table

Notes
<div style="font-size:smaller">
 This year's Grando Fratello contained the largest family ever to compete in Big Brother; Carmela & Filippo are married, and Domenico, Fabio & Giuseppe are their sons. Because of this, the producers felt that they held an advantage in nominations, and the three brothers (Domenico, Fabio and Giuseppe) were automatically nominated for the first eviction.
 The producers decided to give immunity to Carmela, Filippo and Mario this week. They could not nominate or be nominated.
 After Ali's eviction, a round of nomination was held. Only Raffaele was allowed to nominate, and chose to nominate Filippo and Giuseppe. These two then faced the vote of the rest of their housemates, and Filippo was evicted 9-5.
 Housemates only nominated one person each this week. The producers decided that Lina and Teresa should be immune from nominating and being nominated. Shortly after the nominations Benedetta, Thiago's wife, entered as a new housemate.
 The producers decided that Thiago should be Immune from nominating and being nominated.
 The producers decided that Benedetta should be immune from nominating and being nominated.
 Andrea & Thiago were chosen by the producers to face their housemates' vote that night.
 Mirko is exempt as a new housemate, as is Raffaella - the producers' choice.
 Mirko is, again, exempt as he is still new to the house.
 All-female housemates were made immune from being nominated by the producers this week. They could, however, nominate the male housemates. Male housemate Roberto was also made Immune by the producers - he could not nominate or be nominated.
 The producers decided that Christine should be immune from nominating and being nominated.
 The producers decided to award immunity to Francesco. Francesco then had to start a chain of immunity by choosing another housemate to be immune. That housemate then chose another to be immune and this continued until 2 housemates remained. Fabio and Mirko will face the public vote, for the eviction that night, after they were not awarded immunity. 
 Lina was chosen for exemption, and the four or more housemates with the most nominations will face the public vote this week, not the usual three.
 Mario was chosen for exemption, and only the two housemates with the most nominations will face the public vote this week.
 All remaining housemates automatically face the public vote to win this week.</di v>

TV Ratings

Live shows
The live shows aired every Monday on Canale 5.

Daily

The daily shows aired on Canale 5. In addition to the normal daily shows aired at 6.15 pm, a new nightly show named "Grande Fratello night" was aired on Saturday night.

References

2008 Italian television seasons
08